El buscabullas (Brawlers) is a 1976 Mexican western drama film directed by Raúl de Anda, Jr. and starring Rodolfo de Anda, Héctor Suárez, and Silvia Manríquez. It was filmed in Eastmancolor using the Mexiscope process.

Cast
Rodolfo de Anda as Ray
Héctor Suárez as Pancho
Silvia Manríquez as Rosita
Bruno Rey as Ambrosio
Jorge Russek as Ronald McCree
Rebeca Iturbide as Diana McCree
Rodolfo de Anda jr. as Tommy
Carlos López Moctezuma as Doctor William Parker
Ricardo Carrión as Jim
Yolanda Liévana as Claudine
José L. Murillo as Simpson
Gerardo Zepeda as Bartender
Hernando Name as Sheriff

Production
The exterior scenes of El buscabullas were shot in the state of Durango at locations such as Cañón de las Huertas, Lerdo de Tejada, el Saltillo, San Vicente de Chupaderos, and the Peña del Águila Dam from May 17 to May 31, 1974. The interior scenes were shot in sound stages at Estudios América between May 6 to June 22, 1974. The film was also known as Su muerte, unos dólares.

Release
The film premiered in Mexico City at the Cine Maríscala theater for four weeks.

References

External links

Mexican Western (genre) films
1976 Western (genre) films
1976 films
1970s Mexican films